is a railway station in Usuki, Ōita, Japan. It is operated by JR Kyushu and is on the Nippō Main Line.

Lines

Layout 
The station, which is not staffed, consists of an island platform serving at grade. The station building is an old Japanese style structure with a ticket window which is now not staffed and serves only as a waiting room. A footbridge gives access to the island platform where there is another enclosed waiting room which houses an automatic ticket vending machine. A siding branches off the main tracks and terminates in a vehicle shed. Along this siding can be seen the remains of a disused freight platform.

Adjacent stations

History
The Kyushu Railway was nationalised on 1 July 1907. Japanese Government Railways (JGR), designated the track as the Hōshū Main Line on 12 October 1909 and expanded it southwards in phases, with Usuki opening as the new southern terminus on 15 August 1915. On the same day, Shitanoe was opened as one of several intermediate statIns along the new track. On 15 December 1923, the Hōshū Main Line was renamed the Nippō Main Line. With the privatization of Japanese National Railways (JNR), the successor of JGR, on 1 April 1987, the station came under the control of JR Kyushu.

Passenger statistics
In fiscal 2015, there were a total of 19,343 boarding passengers, giving a daily average of 53 passengers.

See also
List of railway stations in Japan

References

External links 

Shitanoe (JR Kyushu)

Railway stations in Ōita Prefecture
Railway stations in Japan opened in 1915